João Arthur Bueno de Camargo also known as João Arthur (born November 16, 1990, in São Paulo), is a Brazilian winger. He currently plays for Atlético Sorocaba.

João Arthur made his debut for Palmeiras as a second-half substitute in a Campeonato Paulista 2010 match against Ituano on 24 January 2010. He had previously appeared for Noroeste in the Campeonato Paulista 2009, where he debuted as a substitute against São Paulo on 25 March 2009.

References

1990 births
Living people
Brazilian footballers
Sociedade Esportiva Palmeiras players
Clube Atlético Sorocaba players
Footballers from São Paulo
Association football midfielders